Alberta Provincial Highway No. 5, commonly referred to as Highway 5, is a  highway that connects Lethbridge to Waterton Lakes National Park in southern Alberta, Canada. It begins as an east–west highway in Waterton and transitions to a north–south route before ending at Crowsnest Trail (Highway 3) in Lethbridge.

Highway 5 is part of the Cowboy Trail between Highway 6 in Waterton Lakes National Park and Cardston.

Route description 
Highway 5 begins in the Hamlet of Waterton Park within Waterton Lakes National Park.  After leaving the park, the highway generally travels east, passing by the hamlets of Mountain View and Leavitt, to the Town of Cardston.  After Cardston, the highway generally travels northeast, passing by the Hamlet of Spring Coulee, the Town of Magrath, and the Hamlet of Welling Station. Shortly after Welling Station, the highway travels north, passing the Hamlet of Welling, before ending at Highway 3 in Lethbridge.

Highway 5 is known as Mayor Magrath Drive within Lethbridge city limits.

Major intersections 
The following is a list of major intersections along Alberta Highway 5 from southwest to northeast.

See also 
Waterton Lakes National Park

External links 

The Cowboy Trail's official webpage

References 

005
Transport in Lethbridge